Skive RC is a Danish rugby club in Skive.

History
The club was founded in 2009.

External links
 Skive RC

Rugby clubs established in 2009
Danish rugby union teams